Bezirk Horn is a district of the state of 
Lower Austria in Austria.

Municipalities
Towns (Städte) are indicated in boldface; market towns (Marktgemeinden) in italics; suburbs, hamlets and other subdivisions of a municipality are indicated in small characters.
Altenburg
Altenburg, Burgerwiesen, Fuglau, Mahrersdorf, Steinegg
Brunn an der Wild
Atzelsdorf, Brunn an der Wild, Dappach, Dietmannsdorf an der Wild, Frankenreith, Fürwald, Neukirchen an der Wild, St. Marein, Waiden, Wutzendorf
Burgschleinitz-Kühnring
Amelsdorf, Burgschleinitz, Buttendorf, Harmannsdorf, Kühnring, Matzelsdorf, Reinprechtspölla, Sachsendorf, Sonndorf, Zogelsdorf
Drosendorf-Zissersdorf
Autendorf, Drosendorf Altstadt, Drosendorf Stadt, Elsern, Heinrichsreith, Oberthürnau, Pingendorf, Unterthürnau, Wolfsbach, Wollmersdorf, Zettlitz, Zissersdorf
Eggenburg
Eggenburg, Engelsdorf, Gauderndorf, Stoitzendorf
Gars am Kamp
Buchberg am Kamp, Etzmannsdorf am Kamp, Gars am Kamp, Kamegg, Kotzendorf, Loibersdorf, Maiersch, Nonndorf bei Gars, Tautendorf, Thunau am Kamp, Wanzenau, Wolfshof, Zitternberg
Geras
Dallein, Fugnitz, Geras, Goggitsch, Harth, Hötzelsdorf, Kottaun, Pfaffenreith, Purgstall, Schirmannsreith, Sieghartsreith, Trautmannsdorf
Horn
Breiteneich, Doberndorf, Horn, Mödring, Mühlfeld
Irnfritz-Messern
Dorna, Grub, Haselberg, Irnfritz, Klein-Ulrichschlag, Messern, Nondorf an der Wild, Reichharts, Rothweinsdorf, Sitzendorf, Trabenreith, Trabenreith, Wappoltenreith
Japons
Goslarn, Japons, Oberthumeritz, Sabatenreith, Schweinburg, Unterthumeritz, Wenjapons, Zettenreith
Langau
Hessendorf, Langau
Meiseldorf
Kattau, Klein-Meiseldorf, Maigen, Stockern
Pernegg
Etzelsreith, Lehndorf, Ludweishofen, Nödersdorf, Pernegg, Posselsdorf, Raisdorf, Staningersdorf
Röhrenbach
Feinfeld, Germanns, Gobelsdorf, Greillenstein, Neubau, Röhrenbach, Tautendorf, Winkl
Röschitz
Klein-Jetzelsdorf, Klein-Reinprechtsdorf, Roggendorf, Röschitz
Rosenburg-Mold
Mold, Mörtersdorf, Rosenburg, Stallegg, Zaingrub, Maria Dreieichen
Sigmundsherberg
Brugg, Kainreith, Missingdorf, Rodingersdorf, Röhrawiesen, Sigmundsherberg, Theras, Walkenstein
Sankt Bernhard-Frauenhofen
Frauenhofen, Groß Burgstall, Grünberg, Poigen, Poigen, St. Bernhard, Strögen
Straning-Grafenberg
Etzmannsdorf bei Straning, Grafenberg, Straning, Wartberg
Weitersfeld
Fronsburg, Heinrichsdorf, Nonnersdorf, Oberfladnitz, Oberhöflein, Obermixnitz, Prutzendorf, Rassingdorf, Sallapulka, Starrein, Untermixnitz, Weitersfeld

 
Districts of Lower Austria